Elections to Rushmoor Borough Council took place on 6 May 2021 as part of the 2021 United Kingdom local elections. This took place at the same time as the elections for Hampshire County Council and the Hampshire Police and Crime Commissioner.

Background 
In the previous election, the Conservatives won nine of the 13 seats up for election. In the 2021 election they were due to defend eight of thirteen seats up for election, and were mathematically incapable of losing their majority.  The statement of persons nominated was published on Friday 9 April.

Results summary

Ward results

Aldershot Park

Cherrywood

Cove and Southwood

Empress

Fernhill

Knellwood

Manor Park

North Town

Rowhill

St John’s

St Mark’s

Wellington

West Heath

References

Rushmoor
2020s in Hampshire
Rushmoor Borough Council elections